Ivan Karetnikov (born 1942) is a retired Soviet  swimmer who specialized in the 200 m breaststroke. In this event, he won a silver medal at the 1962 European Aquatics Championships and a gold medal at the 1963 Universiade, and set three European records between 1962 and 1963.

References

1942 births
Living people
Russian male swimmers
Male breaststroke swimmers
Soviet male swimmers
European Aquatics Championships medalists in swimming
Universiade medalists in swimming
Universiade gold medalists for the Soviet Union
Medalists at the 1963 Summer Universiade
Sportspeople from Volgograd